Devil's Ground is the fifth album by German power metal band Primal Fear. It was released on 23 February 2004.

Music videos were made for "Metal is Forever" and "The Healer".

Track listing
All songs written by Mat Sinner, Ralf Scheepers, Stefan Leibing and Tom Naumann except where noted

Album line-up
Ralf Scheepers - lead vocals
Stefan Leibing - guitars
Tom Naumann - guitars
Mat Sinner - bass guitar, vocals
Randy Black - drums

Production
Mat Sinner - Producer
Achim "Akeem" Köhler - Producer, Engineering, Mixing, Mastering
Leo Hao - Cover art
Ralf Scheepers - Producer
Randy Black - Producer
Tom Naumann - Producer
Stefan Leibing - Producer
Ingmar Schelzel - Engineering
Thomas Ewerhard - Layout
Alex Kuehr - Photography

Nuclear Blast albums
2004 albums
Primal Fear (band) albums